Brian Peter Reid (born 1972) is an entrepreneur who is credited with developing the first digital advertising mirror that is controlled remotely and has the ability to record and report the exact number and duration of consumer engagements in real time. Reid also founded technology firm Mirrus.

Education

Reid received his B.A. with a focus on sociology from The University of Connecticut in 1994. He was a three-year letter winner on the varsity football team while in college and played under head coach Skip Holtz. Reid was elected team captain his senior year.

Career
From 1994 to 1999, Reid worked for Republic Mortgage Insurance Company (RMIC) in sales, where he ultimately became the youngest national sales manager.
Reid left RMIC and started Athlon Ventures, a venture capital fund that raised capital solely from professional sports athletes and Fortune 500 executives. After 12 months, Reid shut down the fund as a result of the “dot-com bubble burst”.

He returned to the financial services industry with SouthStar Funding (SSF), where he was responsible for all sales and marketing initiatives.

Mirrus

In 2006, Reid founded LuxuryTec LLC to market brand identity services. With a proprietary mirror technology, LuxuryTec LLC formed and began doing business as (dba) Mirrus.

Televisions displayed behind two-way mirror glass have been available for roughly 15 years but have been isolated to the hospitality and residential markets. Reid sold a mirror technology for advertising in high consumer traffic areas. Since 2006, Reid served as the president CEO of LuxuryTec LLC and Mirrus located in Winston-Salem, North Carolina.

Personal
Reid is the father of five children and is married to wife Gennifer. The family resides in Winston-Salem, North Carolina.

Reid is the son of Paul S. Reid, former president and executive vice president of the Mortgage Bankers Association of America, Washington, D.C.

References

 Mutzabaugh, Ben, "Fliers to face sensor-equipped ads at O'Hare bathroom sinks," USA Today (http://travel.usatoday.com/flights/post/2011/03/chicago-bathroom-ads/146863/1)
 "Digital mirrors added to Lane Stadium restrooms," WDBJ.com (https://web.archive.org/web/20111230212742/http://www.wdbj7.com/videobeta/82e0813a-3325-406d-9f4c-bc029ee8ad84/Sports/Digital-mirrors-added-to-Lane-Stadium-restrooms)
 Johnson, Leslie Williams "A+ Employers," Atlanta Business Journal (http://www.bizjournals.com/atlanta/stories/2004/09/20/focus7.html)
Chiasson, Gail, "An Interview with Brian Reid of Mirrus," DailyDOOH (http://www.dailydooh.com/archives/60473)
Murin, Joseph J.," A Business Transformed by Technology," Money Library, http://findarticles.com/p/articles/mi_hb5246/is_1_60/ai_n28754650/

1972 births
Living people
American technology company founders